A Good Human Story is an episode of ITV's anthology television series ITV Sunday Night Drama. It was transmitted on that channel on 17 July 1977, and was episode 8 in the second series.

Story
A young girl is found murdered on the outskirts of a seaside resort. When the story breaks out, national newspapermen arrive at the town, which is soon subject to intense rivalry, as all the journalists covering the crime wish to get an exclusive story.

Cast
The drama featured a cast of well known British actors, including Warren Clarke, Phil Daniels, Michael Elphick, Kenneth Haigh and Lynne Perrie.

References

ITV television dramas
1977 British television episodes